Le'Ron De'Mar McClain (born December 27, 1984) is a former American football fullback who played in the National Football League (NFL). He played college football for the University of Alabama, and was drafted by the Baltimore Ravens 137th overall in the fourth round of the 2007 NFL Draft.

Early years and college
McClain was born in Fort Wayne, Indiana.  He played high school football at Tuscaloosa County High School for the Wildcats.

He accepted an athletic scholarship to attend the University of Alabama, where he played for coach Mike Shula's Alabama Crimson Tide football team from 2003 to 2006.

Professional career

2007 NFL Draft
McClain was considered one of the best fullbacks available in the 2007 NFL Draft, and drew comparisons to William Henderson. He was drafted with the 137th pick during the fourth round by the Baltimore Ravens.

Baltimore Ravens 
McClain signed with the Ravens on July 27, 2007. He scored his first career touchdown on a Kyle Boller pass against the San Diego Chargers on November 25, 2007. He finished his rookie season with eight carries for 18 yards, nine receptions for 55 yards, and 1 touchdown.

During the 2008 season, McClain became the team's primary running-back as he rushed for a team-high 902 yards and 10 touchdowns on 232 carries (3.9 yards per carry). He also caught 19 passes for 123 yards and a touchdown. On December 20, 2008, McClain ran for 82 yards to score the final touchdown in Texas Stadium against the Dallas Cowboys. Along with teammate Willis McGahee's 77-yard touchdown run on the previous Ravens drive, he and McGahee became the first players ever to run two 70+ touchdown runs on back-to-back drives. The run was also the longest run by an opponent in Texas Stadium. In addition, McClain had 139 rushing yards on the day. McClain's performance earned him a Pro Bowl selection, in which he scored a touchdown off of a Fumblerooski play handed off by former Denver Broncos quarterback Jay Cutler. Cutler put the ball between McClain's legs in which he ran in for a touchdown.

During his last two years as a Raven, McClain lost carries to Willis McGahee and Ray Rice. He publicly complained about not getting enough touches, which led to his departure from the Ravens.

Kansas City Chiefs
McClain signed a one-year deal with the Kansas City Chiefs on August 3, 2011, after the Baltimore Ravens signed fullback Vonta Leach.

San Diego Chargers
McClain signed a three-year deal with the San Diego Chargers on March 14, 2012.

On March 3, 2014, McClain was released by the Chargers.

Personal life
His cousin, Rolando McClain, is a linebacker who last played for the Dallas Cowboys.

On November 5, 2014, he was arrested on felony charges of trafficking in synthetic marijuana.

References

External links
Official website

1984 births
Living people
Sportspeople from Tuscaloosa, Alabama
African-American players of American football
American Conference Pro Bowl players
American football fullbacks
Alabama Crimson Tide football players
Baltimore Ravens players
Kansas City Chiefs players
Players of American football from Alabama
San Diego Chargers players
21st-century African-American sportspeople
20th-century African-American people